Ismail Sahmali (born 4 January 1982) is a Turkish former professional footballer.

References

External links

1982 births
Living people
Turkish footballers
Süper Lig players
Ankaraspor footballers
Association football goalkeepers
TFF First League players
People from Adana